Adam Scott (1871–unknown) was a Scottish footballer who played in the Football League for Nottingham Forest.

Career
Scott was born in Coatbridge and began his football career with hometown club Albion Rovers in 1888 and joined Nottingham Forest in the early 1890s. He was part of their team that won the 1891–92 Football Alliance, and was a near ever-present in their inaugural League season, making his Football League debut in Forest’s first ever match at Everton in the First Division in September 1892. He was an ever present in his second and third seasons at the club, and the highlight of his career came when he won the 1898 FA Cup with Forest, as they beat local rivals Derby County 3–1 in the final at The Crystal Palace.

However he lost his place in the first half of 1898–99, and whilst he returned in December to play in most of Forest’s remaining fixtures that season, he made only one further appearance in 1899–1900, playing his last game of 201 in total (scoring 4 goals in the process) against Bury in November 1899. Whether through injury or another reason, he retired from the game and his movements after leaving The City Ground are uncertain.

Career statistics
Source:

Honours
 Nottingham Forest
 FA Cup winner: 1898

Notes

References

1871 births
date of death missing
Scottish footballers
English Football League players
Association football defenders
Albion Rovers F.C. players
Nottingham Forest F.C. players
FA Cup Final players
Football Alliance players
Footballers from Coatbridge